Bassam Al-Hurayji (born 29 March 2000) is a Saudi Arabian professional footballer who plays as a midfielder for Pro League side Al-Batin.

Career statistics

Club

Honours
Al-Batin
MS League: 2019–20

References

External links
 

2000 births
Living people
Saudi Arabian footballers
Al Batin FC players
Saudi Professional League players
Saudi First Division League players
Association football midfielders